The Suriname Records in Swimming are the fastest times ever swum by an individual from Suriname. These national records are maintained by Suriname's swimming federation: Surinaamse Zwem Bond (SZB).

SZB keeps records for both for males and females, for events swum in long (50m) and short (25m) course pools. Records are kept in the following events (by stroke):
freestyle (free): 50, 100, 200, 400, 800, 1000 (25m only) and 1500;
backstroke (back): 50, 100 and 200;
breaststroke (breast): 50, 100 and 200;
butterfly (fly): 50, 100 and 200;
individual medley (I.M.): 100 (25m only), 200 and 400;
relays: 4x50 free, 4x100 free, 4x200 free, 4x50 medley, and 4 × 100 medley.

All records were achieved in finals unless otherwise specified.

Long course (50m)

Men

|-bgcolor=#DDDDDD
|colspan=9|
|-

|-bgcolor=#DDDDDD
|colspan=9|
|-

|-bgcolor=#DDDDDD
|colspan=9|
|-

|-bgcolor=#DDDDDD
|colspan=9|
|-

|-bgcolor=#DDDDDD
|colspan=9|
|-

Women

|-bgcolor=#DDDDDD
|colspan=9|
|-

|-bgcolor=#DDDDDD
|colspan=9|
|-

|-bgcolor=#DDDDDD
|colspan=9|
|-

|-bgcolor=#DDDDDD
|colspan=9|
|-

|-bgcolor=#DDDDDD
|colspan=9|
|-

Short course (25m)

Men

|-bgcolor=#DDDDDD
|colspan=9|
|-

|-bgcolor=#DDDDDD
|colspan=9|
|-

|-bgcolor=#DDDDDD
|colspan=9|
|-

|-bgcolor=#DDDDDD
|colspan=9|
|-

|-bgcolor=#DDDDDD
|colspan=9|
|-

Women

|-bgcolor=#DDDDDD
|colspan=9|
|-

|-bgcolor=#DDDDDD
|colspan=9|
|-

|-bgcolor=#DDDDDD
|colspan=9|
|-

|-bgcolor=#DDDDDD
|colspan=9|
|-

References

Suriname
Records
Swimming records
Swimming